The World of the Brotherhood of Man is the third album released by British pop group Brotherhood of Man. Featuring a mix of new and previously-released material, the album contained the group's two biggest hits "United We Stand" and "Where Are You Going To My Love". This was the final release of the early incarnation of the group.

Background 
The album was released on Decca Records (the owner of Deram Records - the group's regular label) in June 1973. The album was a compilation which was released after the original version of the group had disbanded. The album featured six singles by the group, including their most recent, "Say a Prayer", which had been released some months earlier. Also included on the album were four previously unreleased songs as well as some non-album A-sides and B-sides. A re-release of earlier single, "United We Stand" was pulled from this album in late 1973. One of the singles included on the album "California Sunday Morning" received a favourable review in Billboard Magazine, which called it a "ballad beauty" and predicted an entry into the top 60. 

By the time this album was issued, a new line-up of the group was already in place. This version of the group recorded the track "Maybe the Morning" as one of their first releases and went on to record their own versions of "United We Stand" and "Where Are You Going to My Love". In 1976 they performed the song "Follow Me" at the Miss UK televised final.

Track listing 
Side One
"Reach Out Your Hand"
"Say a Prayer"
"Follow Me"
"California Sunday Morning"
"You Are What You Are"
"Where Are You Going to My Love"

Side Two
"Love Me Like I Love You"
"Following a One Man Band"
"This Boy"
"Do Your Thing"
"Maybe the Morning"
"United We Stand"

References 

Brotherhood of Man albums
1973 compilation albums
Albums produced by Tony Hiller
Decca Records compilation albums